The Archaeological and Historical National Park of Pueblo Viejo, La Vega (also known as the National Park of Concepción de la Vega), in the La Vega Province of the Dominican Republic, includes the old city of Concepción de la Vega, and the Pueblo Viejo gold mine. This site was added to the UNESCO World Heritage Tentative List on November 21, 2001 in the Cultural category.

History 
The city of La Concepción de la Vega was founded as a fortress by Christopher Columbus in 1495. The city was built up around the fortress and the gold mine of Pueblo Viejo, as the extraction of precious metals was the main objective of Columbus' missions to the new world. The town was destroyed by an earthquake on December 2, 1562, and the survivors moved to the present site on the banks of the Camú River.

Mining 
The Pueblo Viejo mine is the Dominican Republic's only gold mine, and was at one point the Western Hemisphere's largest and  most productive gold mine.  The first extraction of gold from this site was undertaken in the late 15th and early 16th centuries, however.

Gallery

Notes

References 
Archaeological and Historical National Park of Pueblo Viejo, La Vega (#) - UNESCO World Heritage Centre Accessed 2009-02-26.

Warwick-Ching, T. (1993), The International Gold Trade, Woodhead, .

Dominican Republic culture
La Vega, Dominican Republic